Capanemia is a genus of flowering plants from the orchid family, Orchidaceae. It contains 9 recognized species, all from South America:

Capanemia adelaidae Porto & Brade - Brazil
Capanemia brachycion (Griseb.) Schltr. - Rio Grande do Sul, northern and eastern Argentina, Paraguay, Uruguay
Capanemia carinata Barb.Rodr. - Minas Gerais, São Paulo
Capanemia gehrtii Hoehne - Brazil
Capanemia micromera Barb.Rodr. - Bolivia, Brazil, Argentina, Paraguay, Uruguay
Capanemia paranaensis Schltr. - Paraná
Capanemia pygmaea (Kraenzl.) Schltr. - Brazil, probably extinct
Capanemia superflua (Rchb.f.) Garay - Brazil, Argentina, Paraguay
Capanemia theresae Barb.Rodr. - Brazil

See also 
 List of Orchidaceae genera

References 

 Pridgeon, A.M., Cribb, P.J., Chase, M.A. & Rasmussen, F. eds. (1999). Genera Orchidacearum 1. Oxford Univ. Press.
 Pridgeon, A.M., Cribb, P.J., Chase, M.A. & Rasmussen, F. eds. (2001). Genera Orchidacearum 2. Oxford Univ. Press.
 Pridgeon, A.M., Cribb, P.J., Chase, M.A. & Rasmussen, F. eds. (2003). Genera Orchidacearum 3. Oxford Univ. Press
 Berg Pana, H. 2005. Handbuch der Orchideen-Namen. Dictionary of Orchid Names. Dizionario dei nomi delle orchidee. Ulmer, Stuttgart

External links 

Oncidiinae genera
Oncidiinae